The 2000–01 Essex Senior Football League season was the 30th in the history of Essex Senior Football League a football competition in England.

League table

The league featured 15 clubs which competed in the league last season, along with one new club:
Barkingside, returned to the league system after leaving the Spartan South Midlands League in 1999

League table

References

Essex Senior Football League seasons
2000–01 in English football leagues